Gilcimar may refer to:

Footballers
Gilcimar (footballer, born 1958), Brazilian footballer
Gilcimar (footballer, born 1981), Brazilian forward